Franklin Rafael Gutiérrez (born February 21, 1983), nicknamed "Guti", is a Venezuelan former professional baseball outfielder. He played in Major League Baseball (MLB) for the Cleveland Indians, Seattle Mariners and Los Angeles Dodgers. While primarily a center fielder throughout his career, Gutiérrez transitioned to right field for the Mariners in 2016. He is currently a special assignment coach for the Seattle Mariners organization.

Professional career

Cleveland Indians
On November 18, 2000, Gutiérrez was signed by the Los Angeles Dodgers as an amateur free agent. On April 3, 2004, Gutiérrez  was traded by the Los Angeles Dodgers with a player to be named later (Andrew Brown) to the Cleveland Indians for Milton Bradley and was assigned to Double-A Akron. He entered the season ranked by Baseball America as the No. 3 prospect in the Los Angeles Dodgers organization and the top position prospect, possessing five-tool ability. Previously, Los Angeles refused to include Gutiérrez in a deal over the winter that would have landed the Dodgers first baseman Richie Sexson.

In 2005, Gutiérrez posted a .261 batting average and 42 RBI for Akron, and hit .254 with seven RBI in 19 games with Triple-A Buffalo (then affiliated with the Indians). Between his two minor league stops, he stole 16 bases in 22 attempts. He was among the players that the Indians called up when major league rosters expanded on August 31.

In 2006 after batting .278 in 90 games for Triple-A Buffalo, Gutiérrez played 43 games in the majors after being called up on June 16 and he stayed in the majors the rest of the season. In 2007, he once again began the season in Triple-A Buffalo, but after batting .341, he was called up for good on May 6.

On May 27, 2008, Gutiérrez hit his first career grand slam in an 8-2 win over the Chicago White Sox.

Seattle Mariners
On December 10, 2008, Gutiérrez was traded to the Seattle Mariners as part of a three-team trade. Mariners' general manager Jack Zduriencik noted that the trade would not have gone through had Gutiérrez not been included in the trade.

In 2008, Gutiérrez ranked 3rd among qualifying big league outfielders in UZR, an all-inclusive fielding statistic. Gutiérrez won a Fielding Bible Award as the top fielding right fielder in MLB. Dave Niehaus called Gutiérrez "Death to Flying Things" after a diving catch, a nickname that previously belonged to Bob Ferguson.

In 2009, Gutiérrez had the most errors by a major league center fielder (7), due in part to the significant number of batted balls that he gets to. He led all of Major League Baseball in UZR and UZR/150, and was 6th in the AL in wins above replacement. Gutiérrez won another Fielding Bible Award as the top fielding center fielder in MLB. He batted .283/.339/.425, and ranked second in the American League with 13 sacrifice bunts.

On January 6, 2010, it was reported that Gutiérrez and the Mariners were working on a 4-year contract extension for $20.5 million with a team option for a fifth year.

In 2010, Gutiérrez was awarded his first Gold Glove. He finished the season with a 1.000 fielding average in 146 games as an outfielder. He also came in second place for Defensive Player of the Year on MLB.com awards. He batted .245/.303/.363.

In 2011, in 92 games he batted .224/.261/.273 with one home run. In 2012, in 40 games he batted .260/.309/.420 with 4 home runs.

On April 22, 2013, Gutiérrez spent 60 days on the disabled list due to hamstring injuries (trying to catch a ball), and was activated on June 22 against the Oakland Athletics, but injured his hamstring again after six innings.

On February 13, 2014, he informed the team that he would not be able to play during the 2014 season due to ankylosing spondylitis and irritable bowel syndrome.

On January 26, 2015, the Mariners re-signed Gutiérrez to a minor-league deal with a spring training invite. On June 24, he was recalled from AAA Tacoma to re-join the Major League club. On July 21, 2015, he hit a pinch-hit grand slam against the Detroit Tigers.

Los Angeles Dodgers
On February 20, 2017, the Los Angeles Dodgers signed Gutiérrez to a one-year, $2.6 million, contract. He played in 35 games for the Dodgers, primarily as a pinch hitter, and had 13 hits in 56 at-bats (.232 average) with one homer and eight RBI. His season was shut down for good in June because of a recurrence of ankylosing spondylitis, which had caused him to also miss the 2014 season. He elected free agency on November 2.

Coaching career
On January 27, 2021, it was announced that Gutiérrez had joined the Seattle Mariners organization as a special assignment coach.

See also
 List of Major League Baseball players from Venezuela

References

External links

1983 births
Living people
Akron Aeros players
Buffalo Bisons (minor league) players
Cleveland Indians players
Gold Glove Award winners
Gulf Coast Dodgers players
Jacksonville Suns players
Las Vegas 51s players
Leones del Caracas players
Los Angeles Dodgers players
Major League Baseball outfielders
Major League Baseball players from Venezuela
People from Caracas
Rancho Cucamonga Quakes players
Seattle Mariners players
South Georgia Waves players
Tacoma Rainiers players
Vero Beach Dodgers players
Venezuelan expatriate baseball players in the United States